This is a list of elections in Iceland.

List

External links
Adam Carr's Election Archive
Parties and elections
NSD: European Election Database - Iceland